Turhan Tayan (born 19 October 1943) is a Turkish politician and lawyer.

After his graduation from the Istanbul University Faculty of Law, he was a freelance lawyer and journalist. Provincial Assembly and Provincial Council memberships, XIX. And XX. He was deputy of the Bursa Parliament.

References 

20th-century Turkish politicians
1943 births
20th-century Turkish lawyers
Living people
Ministers of National Defence of Turkey
Istanbul University Faculty of Law alumni